James Selfe (born 23 August 1955) is a South African politician, a Member of Parliament for the opposition Democratic Alliance (DA), and the party's former Federal Council Chairperson. He is also the party's Shadow Minister of Correctional Services. Selfe resigned from Parliament and as the Shadow Minister of Correctional Services with effect from 31 December 2021.

Education and early career
Selfe was born in Pretoria, and attended Bishops (Diocesan College) and the University of Cape Town. After earning a master's degree, Selfe worked between 1979 and 1988 as a researcher for the Progressive Federal Party, the forerunner to today's Democratic Alliance. He became the party's communications director in 1988, and a member of the President's Council a year later. In 1992 he became an executive director of the party.

Parliamentary career 
Selfe was elected to the Senate - later National Council of Provinces - in 1994 and participated in the Constitutional Assembly which drew up the democratic Constitution. In 1999 he stayed in parliament, but moved to the National Assembly.  In 2004, he was re-elected to Parliament and became responsible for the Member of Portfolio Committee on Justice and Correctional Services in addition to being chair of the Democratic Alliance's Federal Council.

In June 2019, Selfe announced his retirement as chair of the Democratic Alliance's Federal Council. He served in the post for almost two decades under the leadership of Tony Leon, Helen Zille and Mmusi Maimane.

In February 2021, Selfe appeared before the Zondo Commission to testify on Bosasa's catering contracts for the Department of Correctional Services. Selfe told the commission that his "many calls over many years" that Parliament should investigate Bosasa "fell on deaf ears".

After 43 years in politics, Selfe announced his retirement in November 2021 due to deteriorating health. On 10 December 2021, the National Assembly bid farewell to long-serving Selfe in its final sitting of 2021. During this sitting, members of Parliament from across the aisle praised Selfe for his contributions to South Africa.

References 

1955 births
Living people
People from Pretoria
South African people of British descent
Democratic Alliance (South Africa) politicians
University of Cape Town alumni
Members of the National Assembly of South Africa
Members of the Senate of South Africa
Members of the National Council of Provinces